Rodolfo Braselli (14 August 1908 – ?) was an Uruguayan basketball player. He competed in the 1936 Summer Olympics.

References

External links

1908 births
Year of death missing
Uruguayan men's basketball players
Olympic basketball players of Uruguay
Basketball players at the 1936 Summer Olympics